Jollett is an unincorporated community in Page County, in the U.S. state of Virginia. It is not as much of a town per se, but it has a number of houses in the area. It is mainly characterized by the fact it is surrounded on all sides by the Blue Ridge Mountains and it having only small valleys.

References

Unincorporated communities in Virginia
Unincorporated communities in Page County, Virginia